Višeslav was one of the first dukes (Croatian: knez) in Dalmatian Croatia.

He ruled with the support of the Pope and Byzantium. The Croats warred against the Franks during his rule and avoided defeat until 803, a year after his death. During the siege of Trsat in the autumn of 799 between the defending forces under his leadership and the invading Frankish army of the Carolingian Empire, the Frankish commander Eric of Friuli was killed. Ultimately, his duchy did accept Frankish overlordship through the Pax Nicephori.Višeslav left behind a baptismal font (Croatian: Višeslavova krstionica), surviving to this day, which remains an important symbol of early Croatian history and the people's conversion to Christianity. The inscription is in Latin and mentions the name of a priest named John (Ivan) who baptized people during "the time of Duke Višeslav" in the honor of John the Baptist.

References

External links
 http://www.croatia-in-english.com/images/maps/800s.jpg

Dukes of Croatia
9th-century rulers in Europe
8th-century rulers in Europe
Christian monarchs
9th-century Croatian people
Year of birth unknown
802 deaths
Slavic warriors